Marek Doronin (born 9 January 1983) is an Estonian professional basketball player. He has played his whole career in Tartu Ülikool/Rock.

Honours

 Won 7 Estonian Championships (2000, 2001, 2004, 2007, 2008, 2010, 2015)
 Won 9 Estonian Cups (2000, 2001, 2002, 2004, 2009, 2010, 2011, 2013, 2014)
 Won 1 BBL Cup (2010)

References

External links
 Profile at sportsdevgroup.com
 Profile at basket.ee
 Profile at bbl.net

1983 births
Living people
Estonian men's basketball players
Korvpalli Meistriliiga players
Tartu Ülikool/Rock players
Small forwards